Lyle Preslar is an American musician best known for being the guitar player and songwriter for the hardcore punk band Minor Threat. Before that, he was the vocalist for The Extorts, who later became State of Alert after he quit. Despite not performing on any State of Alert recordings, Preslar received co-writing credit for the songs "Draw Blank" from the No Policy EP and "I Hate the Kids" from the Dischord Records compilation Flex Your Head.

When Minor Threat dissolved, he played guitar in The Meatmen and the first incarnation of Samhain.

After retiring from performing, he ran Caroline Records, signing Ben Folds, Chemical Brothers, and Fat Boy Slim; he was later a marketing executive for Elektra Records and Sire Records.   In 2007, he graduated from Rutgers School of Law–Newark. He is admitted to practice law in the state of New York.

He is married to Sandy Alouete, an executive at VH1 and they have a child named Romy.

Preslar also won the Grammy Law Initiative Writing Prize in 2007 with an article about the RIAA vs. XM Satellite Radio.

His guitar playing is known to consist of full six string barre chords and be able to keep up speed while not sacrificing accuracy. Ian Mackaye has stated "Lyle Preslar, the guitar player, I mean he's one of the most unsung guitar players. He's playing full, six-string-position barre chords at that speed—that's just insane. His accuracy and his rhythms are so incredible."

Bands
The Extorts
Minor Threat
Samhain
 The Meatmen

References

Bibliography

American punk rock guitarists
Place of birth missing (living people)
Horror punk musicians
Rutgers School of Law–Newark alumni
Year of birth missing (living people)
Living people
Minor Threat members
Samhain (band) members
The Meatmen members